Sir Isaac Emanuel Hyatali was the Chief Justice of the Republic of Trinidad and Tobago from 1972 until 1983. He was knighted by Queen Elizabeth II in 1973. He died of diverticular disease on 2 December 2000.

Education 

After attending Naparima College, he was admitted to practice law at the Court of Gray’s Inn in London in 1947.

References 

Chief justices of Trinidad and Tobago
20th-century Trinidad and Tobago judges
Year of birth missing
Place of birth missing
2000 deaths